Barry R. Kooser is an American artist, painter, and educator who worked at Walt Disney Feature Animation Studios between 1992 and 2003 as a background artist on films such as The Lion King, Pocahontas, Mulan, Lilo & Stitch, and as background supervisor on Brother Bear. After leaving Disney, he worked independently as a painter exhibiting and selling fine art in galleries around the US. While teaching animation and story-boarding at Rocky Mountain College of Art + Design, he met Worker Studio founder Michael "Ffish" Hemschoot, and became a partner at the Colorado animation studio. Barry has since left Worker Studio. He is the Founder, Executive Producer and Director at Many Hoops Productions.

Early life and education
Born in Wheat Ridge, Colorado, Kooser grew up in the neighboring city of Arvada, where he graduated from Arvada West High School in 1987. He received a Bachelor of Fine Arts in Illustration from Kansas City Art Institute in 1991. After a summer internship at Walt Disney Feature Animation Studios in Orlando, Florida, Kooser was hired at the studio as a background artist.

Influences
Early artistic influences include: Illustrators Howard Pyle, N.C. Wyeth, Dean Cornwell and Mark English. Fine Art Painting influences include: Edgar Payne, Joaquin Sorolla, John Singer Sargent and Richard Diebenkorn.  Noting his film influences in an article, Kooser selected 5 production designs that continue to inspire him creatively. The selections include Disney's Lady and the Tramp, Tyrus Wong's work on Bambi, Dennis Gassner and Richard L. Johnson's work on Road to Perdition, Ralph McQuarrie's work on Star Wars, and Dean Mitzner's work on Tron.

Disney years
Kooser's first film at Disney Animation Studios was as an in between artist on the Roger Rabbit animated short, Trail Mix-Up in 1993. He continued to work as a background artist on projects at Disney's Orland, Florida Studio, including the features The Lion King, Pocahontas, Mulan, and Lilo & Stitch.

In 2001, as background supervisor on Brother Bear, Kooser and his team traveled to Jackson Hole, Wyoming and studied with Western landscape painter Scott Christensen, where they learned to: "simplify objects by getting the spatial dimensions to work first and working in the detail later."

Filmography

See also
Worker Studio
Michael "Ffish" Hemschoot

References

External links
 
 Barry Kooser on Panel at 2013 Denver Comic Con – Denver Comic Con 2013: So You Wanna Be a Concept Artist

Living people
American animators
Computer animation people
Background artists
American art directors
Walt Disney Animation Studios people
20th-century American painters
American male painters
21st-century American painters
21st-century male artists
American landscape painters
Painters from Colorado
Artists from Colorado
Kansas City Art Institute alumni
1968 births